Ichhapasar  is a village in Chanditala I community development block of Srirampore subdivision in Hooghly district in the Indian state of West Bengal.

Geography

Gram panchayat
Villages in Haripur gram panchayat are: Anantarampur, Bade Sola, Baghati, Ban Panchbere, Chak Bangla, Chota Choughara, Dudhkomra, Haripur, Ichhapasar, Jagmohanpur, Mamudpur and Radhaballabhpur.

Demographics
As per 2011 Census of India, Ichhapasar had a total population of 1,442 of which 722 (50%) were males and 720 (50%) were females. Population below 6 years was 141. The total number of literates in Ichhapasar was 1,059 (81.40% of the population over 6 years).

Healthcare 
Akuni Ichhapasar Rural Hospital at Aniya functions with 30 beds.

Transport
Bargachia railway station and Baruipara railway station are the nearest railway stations.

References

Villages in Chanditala I CD Block